Mesosa vagemarmorata is a species of beetle in the family Cerambycidae. It was described by Stephan von Breuning in 1961. It is known from Vietnam.

References

vagemarmorata
Beetles described in 1961